W. Ward Reynoldson (May 17, 1920 – March 28, 2016) was an American lawyer and judge.

Born in St. Edward, Nebraska, Reynoldson graduated from Wayne State College, in Wayne, Nebraska, in 1942 and then served in the U.S. Navy during World War II. He received his law degree in 1948, from the University of Iowa College of Law. Reynoldson practiced law in Osceola, Iowa. Reynoldson served as Justice of the Iowa Supreme Court from May 1, 1971, until his retirement on October 1, 1987, appointed from Clarke County, Iowa. From August 3, 1978, until his retirement, he served as chief justice. In that role, he facilitated a pilot program to allow cameras in the courtroom.

References

External links

1920 births
2016 deaths
Justices of the Iowa Supreme Court
Military personnel from Iowa
United States Navy personnel of World War II
People from St. Edward, Nebraska
People from Osceola, Iowa
Wayne State College alumni
University of Iowa College of Law alumni
Iowa lawyers
Chief Justices of the Iowa Supreme Court
20th-century American judges
20th-century American lawyers